Anhuaqiao station  is a station on Line 8 of the Beijing Subway. This station opened on December 30, 2012.

Station layout 
The station has an underground island platform.

Exits 
There are 5 exits, lettered A, B, C, D, and E. Exits A and C are accessible.

References

External links 

Railway stations in China opened in 2012
Beijing Subway stations in Xicheng District
Beijing Subway stations in Chaoyang District